Skjoldhøjkilen is a recreational and natural site, in the district of Brabrand in the western part of Aarhus in Denmark. It stretches westwards from Hasle Hills, like a wavy green strip of meadows, small lakes and woodlands. It is 3.5 km long and just as Hasle Hills, it is administered by the self-governing institution 'Hasle Bakker'.

Reconstruction
The landscape and nature of Skjoldhøjkilen was recently restored and recreated in a series of five construction projects finished in 2005. The projects comprised afforestations, restoration of the stream of Voldbækken, construction of multipurpose rainwater reservoirs, and various road constructions. As a consequence, Skjoldhøjkilen now constitutes a connected woodland area with the newly raised  forest of True Skov to the west, thereby constituting a large green wedge of nature cutting its way into the city from the countryside. This is all part of the implementation of Aarhus Municipality's agenda "Aarhus surrounded by forests" and "The Green Mainstructure", initiated in 1988 and resulting in the New Forests of Aarhus. The total woodland-area of Skjoldhøjkilen and True Skov, is comparable in size to the Marselisborg Forests, south of Aarhus.

The activity landscape

Together with Hasle Hills, Skjoldhøjkilen forms a so-called 'activity landscape' and is so far the only one of its kind in Denmark. The activity landscape have been designed to facilitate play, learning, exercise and various recreational activities for citizens of all ages in Aarhus and the project have been financed by Realdania and the former Ministry for Integration. The activity landscape was inaugurated 25 May 2009.

As in Hasle Hills, Skjoldhøjkilen has established mountain bike routes, which are marked to avoid conflict with other users of the area. There are several play areas, exercise apparatus and public shelters, scattered across the landscape and the whole area is designed for public recreational use of all kinds.

Every summer, the small music festival of Danmarks Grimmeste Festival is held at a private farm situated in Skjoldhøjkilen.

Nature

The reconstruction and restorations of Skjoldhøjkilen has been successful in attracting and supporting a rich and varied flora and fauna in the area.

Wetlands
The stream of Voldbækken has been relieved from a burden of urban pollution and excessive nutrients, threatening the stream with eutrophication. These improvements now invites the brown trout in the Aarhus River to spawn here.

Some of the rainwater basins supports fish like common roach and abramis and various protected amphibians like northern crested newt. The wetlands attracts many species of insects and birds, with numerous ducks and Eurasian coots. Solitary grey herons are regularly seen here, hunting for fish.

Skjoldhøjkilen has a rich population of European tree frogs - which is uncommon in Denmark - and the soft, nutritious wet earth is popular with moles.

Alder swamp
There is an alder carr of black alder in Skjoldhøjkilen. Alder swamps are one of the primeval forest types of Denmark. Skjoldhøjkilen  supports many species of the Corvidae and the alder swamp is home to a noisy colony of rooks.

Gallery

References

Sources 
 Hasle Bakker homepage for the organization 
 Skjoldhøjkilen - a recreational area Aarhus Municipality 
 Hasle Hills - Learning in nature ULF i Aarhus, Aarhus Municipality

External links

 Hasle Interactive Alexandra Institute

Geography of Aarhus